Estádio José Pinheiro Borda, better known as Estádio Beira-Rio or simply Beira-Rio, (Riverside Stadium) due to its location beside the Guaíba River, is a football stadium in Porto Alegre, Brazil. It serves as the home stadium for Sport Club Internacional, replacing their previous stadium, the Estádio dos Eucaliptos. It is named after José Pinheiro Borda (1897–1965), an elderly Portuguese engineer who supervised the building of the stadium but died before seeing its completion.

Estádio Beira-Rio was one of the 12 venues used for the 2014 FIFA World Cup, hosting five of the matches in the tournament.

General information
 Grass: TifGrand
 Box offices: 4, with 68 booths
 Toilets: 81
 Capacity 50,128 (7,500 VIP seats)
 Executive suites 125 (70 suites + 55 skyboxes)
 Video screens 2 ( each)
 Parking 5,500
 Record Attendance 106,554 (Rio Grande do Sul All-Stars 3–3 Brazil national football team, on June 17, 1972)

History
In 1956, councilman Ephraim Pinheiro Cabral presented a document to the government that included a donation of part of the Guaíba, to be reclaimed for Sport Club Internacional.

Estádio Beira-Rio was constructed with the help of the club's enthusiasts and supporters. They contributed by bringing bricks, concrete and iron.

During the 1960s, Estádio Beira-Rio was called "Bóia Cativa", since it seemed that it would never be completed, especially since those were difficult times for Internacional on the field.

The stadium's debut was played on April 6, 1969, when Internacional beat Portugal's Benfica 2–1. The first goal ever scored in the stadium was done by Internacional's Claudiomiro.

Current situation
Beira-Rio is the second biggest stadium in the Rio Grande do Sul state and also South Brazil. The stadium has recently been renovated to host the 2014 FIFA World Cup. The Beira-Rio complex also houses a chapel, an events center, bars, stores and a parking building for 3,000 cars. Parque Gigante, featuring pools, gyms, football fields, and tennis courts, is located next to it. The first test event after the stadium's renovation was hosted on February 15, 2014 in a match between Internacional and Caxias, a local club, for the Campeonato Gaúcho.

Improvement and restoration

The stadium has gone through restoration and developments that makes it fit to host matches during the 2014 FIFA World Cup in Brazil. Internacional has a project of restoration and improvement of Beira-Rio complex named 'Gigante Para Sempre' (Giant Forever). The stadium has been adapted to an international standard, ready to host any national or international game. Beira-Rio is one of the only 2014 FIFA World Cup stadiums to be privately owned.

The first test event for the new stadium was on February 15, 2014. Internacional beat SER Caxias and won 4-0. The first official game was played on April 6, 2014. Internacional played against Peñarol of Uruguay and beat them 2-1.

2014 FIFA World Cup

Concerts

References

Enciclopédia do Futebol Brasileiro, Volume 2 - Lance, Rio de Janeiro: Aretê Editorial S/A, 2001.
Sport Club Internacional Official web site

External links

Sport Club Internacional
Football venues in Rio Grande do Sul
2014 FIFA World Cup stadiums
Sports venues completed in 1969